Ángel Chiessa (1902 – 15 October 1961) was an Argentine footballer. He played in nine matches for the Argentina national football team in 1922 and 1923. He was also part of Argentina's squad for the 1922 South American Championship.

References

External links
 

1902 births
1961 deaths
Argentine footballers
Argentina international footballers
Place of birth missing
Association football forwards
Club Atlético Huracán footballers
Argentinos Juniors footballers